Georgijs Pujacs (born June 11, 1981 in Riga, Soviet Union) is a Latvian ice hockey defenceman who currently plays for Dresdner Eislöwen of the DEL2.

Playing career
Pujacs was drafted by Boston Bruins as the 264th pick in the 1999 NHL Entry Draft, after a strong performance in 1999 Division 1 European Junior Championships. After being drafted, he played minor league ice hockey in North America for a year but did not reach the NHL. He then returned to Latvia and has mostly played for Latvian teams in the Latvian League and Eastern European Hockey League. In July 2006, Pujacs signed a two-year contract with Khimik Moscow Oblast of Russian Elite League, then joined HC Lada Togliatti on 6 November 2007. On 14 January 2009, Pujacs returned to Latvia and signed with Dinamo Riga of the KHL and left on 13 July 2009 to sign with Dinamo Riga's rival HC Sibir Novosibirsk.

Career statistics

Regular season and playoffs

International

External links 
 
 
 
 
 
 

1981 births
Anchorage Aces players
Atlant Moscow Oblast players
Avangard Omsk players
Boston Bruins draft picks
Dinamo Riga players
Dresdner Eislöwen players
Elmira Jackals (UHL) players
Latvian expatriate ice hockey people
HC '05 Banská Bystrica players
HC Dinamo Minsk players
HC Lada Togliatti players
HC Neftekhimik Nizhnekamsk players
HC Sibir Novosibirsk players
HK Liepājas Metalurgs players
HK Riga 2000 players
Ice hockey players at the 2006 Winter Olympics
Ice hockey players at the 2010 Winter Olympics
Ice hockey players at the 2014 Winter Olympics
Latvian ice hockey defencemen
Living people
Olympic ice hockey players of Latvia
Örebro HK players
Prizma Riga players
Rochester Mustangs players
Ice hockey people from Riga
Latvian expatriate sportspeople in Russia
Latvian expatriate sportspeople in Germany
Latvian expatriate sportspeople in the United States
Latvian expatriate sportspeople in Sweden
Latvian expatriate sportspeople in Belarus
Expatriate ice hockey players in Russia
Expatriate ice hockey players in Germany
Expatriate ice hockey players in the United States
Expatriate ice hockey players in Sweden
Expatriate ice hockey players in Belarus